New Eastern Bus Station (Vietnamese: Ga Bến xe Miền Đông mới) is a planned elevated Ho Chi Minh City Metro terminus station for Line 1 under construction. Located at the New Eastern Bus Station in Dĩ An, Bình Dương Province, the station is set to open in 2024.

References

Ho Chi Minh City Metro stations
Proposed buildings and structures in Vietnam
Railway stations scheduled to open in 2024